"Eleanor Rigby" is a song by the Beatles.

Eleanor Rigby may also refer to:

 Eleanor Rigby (novel), a novel by Douglas Coupland
 Eleanor Rigby (statue), a statue in Liverpool, England

See also
 The Disappearance of Eleanor Rigby, a 2013 film starring James McAvoy